Events in the year 1811 in Norway.

Incumbents
Monarch: Frederick VI

Events
29 May - The Society for the Welfare of Oslo is founded. 
2 September - University of Oslo is founded. It is the first university founded in the Dano-Norwegian Union.

Arts and literature
 The Norwegian journal Historisk-philosophiske Samlinger (Historical-Philosophical Collections) first issue was published.

Births
10 October – Nils Christian Irgens, military officer, politician and Minister (d.1878)
17 December – Jens Landmark, military officer and politician (d.1880)

Full date unknown
Jørres Schelderup Hansen, politician
Frederik Christian Stoud Platou, politician (d.1891)

Deaths
8 November - Honoratus Bonnevie, physician (b.1726)

See also